Star Tales is the debut album by the Greek electronic/operatic metal band Dol Ammad. The album features a 12-piece choir of six men and six women called the Europa Choir that performed all the vocal duties.

Track listing
 "Dreamport" - 3:11  
 "Eclipse (Corona of the Sun)" - 4:09
 "Weaver's Dance" - 7:47
 "Boxed Daylight Part 1" - 2:57  
 "Boxed Daylight Part 2" - 3:00
 "The Veil (Seven Face Danger)" - 5:24
 "Back to the Zone" - 4:24  
 "Master of All" - 5:47
 "The Hill of Hope" - 7:16
 "Kruug" - 3:06  
 "Vortex 3003" - 4:58
 "Mission Butterfly" - 10:00

Personnel

Line-up
Thanasis Lightbridge - synthesizers
Alex Holzwarth - drums
Jimmy Wicked - guitars
Nick Terry - bass

Europa Choir
Kortessa Tsifodimou - soprano vocals
Alexandra Voulgari - soprano vocals
Zoe Tsokanou - soprano vocals
Marieta Panagiotidou - alto vocals
Vicky Alexaki - alto vocals
Maria Stolaki - alto vocals
Panos Iampoultakis - tenor vocals
Themis Mpasdekis - tenor vocals
Alexandros Barmpas - tenor vocals
Kyriakos Chouvardas - bass vocals
Petros Moraitis - bass vocals
Yiannis Tsalouhidis - bass vocals

Credits
Thanasis Lightbridge - music composition and arrangement, lyrics, production, layout, art direction
Sascha Paeth - drum recording and production
Olaf Reitmeier - drum recording and production
Brian Exton - artwork
Angelos Zymaras - photography
Stamatis Kritikos - layout, art direction

References

2004 debut albums
Dol Ammad albums